Mario Pavelić (born 19 September 1993) is an Austrian professional footballer who plays as a right back for Lithuanian club FK Žalgiris.

Club career
In summer 2013, he was promoted to Rapid Wien's first team squad by head coach Zoran Barišić. In May 2018, Pavelić signed a three year contract with HNK Rijeka in Croatia. On 31 July 2019, Pavelić was loaned to Sarpsborg 08 FF in Norway until the end of the year.

On 5 October 2020, he signed with Wolfsberger AC.

In August 2021 he signed with Lithuanian FK Žalgiris. In 9 August 2021 he made his debut in A Lyga against Banga.

International career
Pavelić was born in Austria to Bosnian parents from Sarajevo, and was called up to represent Bosnia internationally. Pavelić has represented Austria at youth levels, from under-16 to under-19.

Honours

Rijeka
 Croatian Cup: 2019

External links

References

1993 births
Living people
People from Eisenstadt
Austrian people of Bosnia and Herzegovina descent
Association football defenders
Austrian footballers
Austria youth international footballers
SK Rapid Wien players
HNK Rijeka players
Sarpsborg 08 FF players
FC Admira Wacker Mödling players
Wolfsberger AC players
FK Žalgiris players
Austrian Regionalliga players
Austrian Football Bundesliga players
Croatian Football League players
Eliteserien players
A Lyga players
Expatriate footballers in Croatia
Austrian expatriate sportspeople in Croatia
Expatriate footballers in Norway
Austrian expatriate sportspeople in Norway
Expatriate footballers in Lithuania
Austrian expatriate sportspeople in Lithuania
Footballers from Burgenland